The Funnel(-neck-)beaker culture, in short TRB or TBK was an archaeological culture in north-central Europe. 
It developed as a technological merger of local neolithic and mesolithic techno-complexes between the lower Elbe and middle Vistula rivers. These predecessors were the Lengyel-influenced Stroke-ornamented ware culture (STK) groups/Late Lengyel and Baden-Boleráz in the southeast, Rössen groups in the southwest and the Ertebølle-Ellerbek groups in the north. The TRB introduced farming and husbandry as a major source of food to the pottery-using hunter-gatherers north of this line.

The TRB techno-complex is divided into a northern group including modern northern Germany and southern Scandinavia (TRB-N, roughly the area that previously belonged to the Ertebølle-Ellerbek complex), a western group in the Netherlands between the Zuiderzee and lower Elbe that originated in the Swifterbant culture, an eastern group centered on the Vistula catchment, roughly ranging from Oder to Bug, and south-central groups (TRB-MES, Altmark) around the middle and upper Elbe and Saale. Especially in the southern and eastern groups, local sequences of variants emerged. In the late 4th millennium BC, the Globular Amphora culture (GAC) replaced most of the eastern and subsequently also the southern TRB groups, reducing the TRB area to modern northern Germany and southern Scandinavia. 
The younger TRB in these areas was superseded by the Single Grave culture (EGK) at about 2800 BC. 
The north-central European megaliths were built primarily during the TRB era.

Nomenclature
The Funnelbeaker culture is named for its characteristic ceramics, beakers and amphorae with funnel-shaped tops, which were found in dolmen burials.

History

The Funnelbeaker culture emerged in northern modern-day Germany . Archaeological evidence strongly suggests that it originated through a migration of colonists from the Michelsberg culture of Central Europe. The Michelsberg culture is archaeologically and genetically strongly differentiated from the preceding post-Linear Pottery cultures of Central Europe, being distinguished by increased levels of hunter-gatherer ancestry. Its people were probably descended from farmers migrating into Central Europe out of Iberia and modern-day France, who in turn were descended from farmers of the Cardial Ware cultures who had migrated westwards from the Balkans along the Mediterranean coast. Connections between the Funnelbeakers and these farmers of the Atlantic coast is supported by genetic evidence.

After its establishment, the Funnelbeaker culture rapidly spread into southern Scandinavia and Poland, in what appears to have been a well-organized colonizing venture. In southern Scandinavia it replaced the Ertebølle culture, which had maintained a Mesolithic lifestyle for about 1500 years after farming arrived in Central Europe. The emergence of the Neolithic British Isles through maritime colonization by Michelsberg-related groups occurred almost at the same time as the expansion of the Funnelbeaker culture into Scandinavia, suggesting that these events may be connected. Although they were largely of Early European Farmer (EEF) descent, people of the Funnelbeaker culture had a relatively high amount of hunter-gatherer admixture, particularly in Scandinavia, suggesting that hunter-gatherer populations were partially incorporated into it during its expansion into this region. People of the Funnelbeaker culture often had between 30% and 50% hunter-gatherer ancestry depending on the region. 

During later phases of the Neolithic, the Funnelbeaker culture re-expanded out of Scandinavia southwards into Central Europe, establishing several regional varieties. This expansion appears to have been accompanied by significant human migration. The southward expansion of the Funnelbeaker culture was accompanied by a substantial increase in hunter-gatherer lineages in Central Europe. The Funnelbeaker communities in Central Europe which emerged were probably quite genetically and ethnically mixed, and archaeological evidence suggests that they were relatively violent.

From the middle of the 4th millennium BC, the Funnelbeaker culture was gradually replaced by the Globular Amphora culture on its southeastern fringes, and began to decline in Scandinavia.

In the early 3rd millennium BC, the Corded Ware culture appeared in Northern Europe. Its peoples were of marked steppe-related ancestry and traced their origins in cultures further east. This period is distinguished by the construction of numerous defensive palisades in Funnelbeaker territory, which may be a sign of violent conflict between the Funnelbeakers, Corded Ware, and Pitted Ware. By 2650 BC, the Funnelbeaker culture had been replaced by the Corded Ware culture. Genetic studies suggest that Funnelbeaker women were incorporated into the Corded Ware culture through intermixing with incoming Corded Ware males, and that people of the Corded Ware culture continued to use Funnelbeaker megaliths as burial grounds. Subsequent cultures of Late Neolithic, Bronze Age, and Iron Age Central Europe display strong maternal genetic affinity with the Funnelbeaker culture.

Distribution
The TRB ranges from the Elbe catchment in Germany and Bohemia with a western extension into the Netherlands, to southern Scandinavia (Denmark up to Uppland in Sweden and the Oslofjord in Norway) in the north, and to the Vistula catchment in Poland and the area between Dnister and Western Bug headwaters in Ukraine in the east.

Variants of the Funnelbeaker culture in or near the Elbe catchment area include the Tiefstich pottery group in northern Germany as well as the cultures of the Baalberge group (TRB-MES II and III; MES = Mittelelbe-Saale), the Salzmünde and Walternienburg and Bernburg (all TRB-MES IV) whose centres were in Saxony-Anhalt.

Characteristics

Settlements

With the exception of some inland settlements such as the Alvastra pile-dwelling, the settlements are located near those of the previous Ertebølle culture on the coast. It was characterised by single-family daubed houses c. 12 m x 6 m.

In Olszanica 5000 BCE a longhouse was constructed with 2.2 m wide doors, presumably for wagon entry. This building was 40 m long with 3 doors.

Economy
The Funnelbeaker culture was dominated by animal husbandry of sheep, cattle, pigs and goats, but there was also hunting and fishing. Primitive wheat and barley was grown on small patches that were fast depleted, due to which the population frequently moved small distances. There was also mining (in the Malmö region) and collection of flintstone (Świętokrzyskie Mountains), which was traded into regions lacking the stone, such as the Scandinavian hinterland. The culture used copper from Silesia, especially daggers and axes.

Technology

The Funnelbeaker Culture preserves the oldest dated evidence of wheeled vehicles in middle Europe.  One example is the engraving on a ceramic tureen from Bronocice in Poland on the northern edge of the Beskidy Mountains (northern Carpathian ring), which is indirectly dated to the time span from 3636 to 3373 BC and is the oldest evidence for covered carriages in Central Europe. They were drawn by cattle, presumably oxen whose remains were found with the pot. Today it is housed in the Archaeological Museum of Cracow (Muzeum Archeologiczne w Krakowie), Poland.

At Flintbek in northern Germany cart tracks dating from c. 3400 BC were discovered underneath a megalithic long barrow. This is the earliest known direct evidence for wheeled vehicles in the world (i.e. not models or images).

Graves

Houses were centered on a monumental grave, a symbol of social cohesion. Burial practices were varied, depending on region and changed over time. Inhumation seems to have been the rule.

The oldest graves consisted of wooden chambered cairns inside long barrows, but were later made in the form of passage graves and dolmens. Originally, the structures were probably covered with a mound of earth and the entrance was blocked by a stone.

The Funnelbeaker culture marks the appearance of megalithic tombs at the coasts of the Baltic and of the North sea, an example of which are the Sieben Steinhäuser in northern Germany. The megalithic structures of Ireland, France and Portugal are somewhat older and have been connected to earlier archeological cultures of those areas. At graves, the people sacrificed ceramic vessels that contained food along with amber jewelry and flint-axes.

Religion

Flint-axes and vessels were also deposited in streams and lakes near the farmlands, and virtually all of Sweden's 10,000 flint axes that have been found from this culture were probably sacrificed in water. They also constructed large cult centres surrounded by pales, earthworks and moats. The largest one is found at Sarup on Fyn. It comprises 85,000 m2 and is estimated to have taken 8000 workdays. Another cult centre at Stävie near Lund comprises 30,000 m2.

Ethnicity
In the context of the Kurgan hypothesis (or steppe hypothesis), the culture is seen as non-Indo-European, representing a culture of Neolithic origin, as opposed to the Indo-European-language-speaking peoples (see Yamna culture) who later intruded from the east.

Marija Gimbutas postulated that the political relationship between the aboriginal and intrusive cultures resulted in quick and smooth cultural morphosis into the Corded Ware culture.

In the past, a number of other archaeologists proposed that the Corded Ware culture was a purely local development of the Funnelbeaker culture, but genetic evidence has since demonstrated that this was not the case.

Gallery

Genetics

All genetic finds in the following are assigned to the Funnelbeaker (TrB) culture.

 examined 3 skeletons from Gökhem, Sweden which belonged to the maternal haplogroups H, J and T.

 examined another skeleton from Gökhem, Sweden. He was found to be a carrier of the maternal haplogroup H. He was mostly genetically similar to modern Southern Europeans, while people of the Pitted Ware culture and other hunter-gatherers examined were found to be most genetically similar to modern Northern Europeans.

 found that the Funnelbeaker culture of Scandinavia had a higher amount of hunter-gatherer maternal lineages than other cultures of Middle Neolithic Europe. They also found that the emergence of the Bernburg culture, a late variant of the Funnelbeaker culture in Central Europe,  was accompanied by a genetic shift towards the population of Northern Europe, which was detected by significantly increased amount of hunter-gatherer lineages.

 again examined 3 skeletons from Gökhem, Sweden c. 5050-4750 BC. The 3 samples belonged to the maternal haplogroups H1c, K1e and H24. The study found hunter-gatherer admixture among the Funnelbeakers, but no evidence of Funnebeaker admixture among the Pitted Ware.

 examined 9 skeletons from Resmo, Sweden and Gökhem, Sweden c. 3300-2600 BC. The 8 samples of mtDNA extracted belonged to various subtypes of maternal haplogroup J, H/R, N, K and T. The examined Funnelbeakers were closely related to Central European farmers, and different from people of the contemporary Pitted Ware culture. The striking diversity of the maternal lineages suggested that maternal kinship was of little importance in Funnelbeaker society. The evidence suggested that the Neolithization of Scandinavia was accompanied by significant human migration.

 analysed 3 skeletons of the Baalberge group of the Funnelbeaker culture. Two samples belonged to Y-haplogroup I and R1b1a, while the 3 samples of mtDNA belonged to haplogroup H1e1a, HV and T2e1. A male of the Salzmünde/Bernburg groups of the Funnelbeaker culture buried in Esperstedt, c. 3360-3086 BC  carried the Y-haplogroup I2a1b1a1 and the maternal haplogroup T2b.

 examined 3 skeletons ascribed to the Salzmünde group of the Funnelbeaker culture. The 2 samples belonged to Y-haplogroup G2a2a1 and IJK, while the 3 samples of mtDNA extracted belonged to haplogroup H2 (2 samples) and U3a1.

 examined an early Funnelbeaker female skeleton from Kvärlöv, Sweden ca. 3945–3647 BC. She carried maternal haplogroup T2b. She was closely related to people of the Linear Pottery culture, but with increased level of hunter-gatherer admixture, which is comparable to other Middle Neolithic and Chalcolithic farmers of Europe. Genetic continuity with later Funnelbeaker samples was detected. Her hunter-gatherer admixture appeared to have been derived from a Western Hunter-Gatherer (WHG) or Baltic Hunter-Gatherer source rather than a Scandinavian Hunter-Gatherer (SHG) source. Slight traces of Funnelbeaker ancestry was detected among the Pitted Ware culture (PWC).

 examined 9 skeletons from a megalith in Ansarve on the island of Gotland, Sweden c. 3500-2580 BC. The 4 samples Y-haplogroups I2a1b1a1 (3 samples) and I2a1b, while the 9 samples of mtDNA belonged to the maternal haplogroups K1a, K1a2b, T2b8, J1c5, HV0a, J1c8a and K2b1a (2 samples). They were found to be mostly of Early European Farmer (EEF) descent, but with significant hunter-gatherer ancestry, which appeared to be primarily male-derived. Their paternal lineage I is of hunter-gatherer origin, and people examined from contemporary megaliths in other parts of western Europe also belonged to this lineage. The uniformity of the paternal lineages suggested that these peoples belonged to a patrilineal and socially stratified society. They were found to be more closely related peoples of Neolithic Britain than peoples of Neolithic Central Europe, suggesting that they derived much of their ancestry from people who migrated along the European Atlantic coast.

 examined 2 skeletons from Rössberga, Östergötland, Sweden c. 3330-2920 BC. The 1 sample Y-haplogroup IJ-M429*, while the 2 samples of mtDNA extracted belonged to haplogroup J1c5 and U3a’c. They were found to be genetically related to Central European farmers of the Middle Neolithic, and were clearly differentiated from people of the contemporary Pitted Ware culture and the succeeding Battle Axe culture. People buried in Funnelbeaker megaliths during the time of the Battle Axe culture were found to be most closely related to Battle Axe people. Traces of Funnelbeaker admixture was however detected among the Battle Axe people. The evidence suggested that the Battle Axe culture entered Scandinavia through a migration from Eastern Europe, after which Battle Axe males mixed with Funnelbeaker females.

 found that the Funnelbeaker culture was mostly of Early European Farmer (EEF) ancestry. Among Funnelbeakers in Scandinavia, hunter-gatherer ancestry was estimated to be at about 50%, while in Central Europe it was at about 40%, with the remaining being EEF. Samples from the latest phases of the Funnelbeaker culture contained higher amounts of hunter-gatherer ancestry. The hunter-gatherers of the Pitted Ware culture, who displaced the Funnelbeakers throughout the coasts of southern Scandinavia, were found to carry slight amount of Funnelbeaker admixture.

See also

 Western Linear Pottery culture
 Pit–Comb Ware culture
 Cardium Pottery culture
 Vlaardingen culture
 Prehistory and protohistory of Poland
 Stone Age Poland § Neolithic
 Scandinavian prehistory
 Prehistoric Germany
 Prehistoric Europe
 Old Europe
 Neolithic Europe
 Invention of the wheel

Footnotes

Sources

 
 
 
J. P. Mallory, "TRB Culture", Encyclopedia of Indo-European Culture, Fitzroy Dearborn, 1997.
 
 
 
 
 
 
 
 
 
 Joachim Preuß. 1996. Das Neolithikum in Mitteleuropa, Kulturen - Wirtschaft 
 

Nationalencyklopedin
 
 
 
 
 
Wade, Nicholas, "The Twists and Turns of History, and DNA", The New York Times'' March 12, 2006.
Pedersen, Hilthart, "Die jüngere Steinzeit auf Bornholm", München & Ravensburg 2008.

External links

 
Nordic Stone Age
Neolithic cultures of Europe
Archaeological cultures of Central Europe
Archaeological cultures of Northern Europe
Archaeological cultures in the Czech Republic
Archaeological cultures in Denmark
Archaeological cultures in Germany
Archaeological cultures in the Netherlands
Archaeological cultures in Norway
Archaeological cultures in Poland
Archaeological cultures in Sweden
Archaeological cultures in Ukraine